Wieners is a 2008 American comedy film directed by Mark Steilen and starring Fran Kranz, Kenan Thompson, Jenny McCarthy and Darrel Hammond. It was written by Suzanne Francis and Gabe Grifoni.

Plot
Joel's girlfriend breaks up with him on the advice of abusive television therapist Dr. Dwayne. His two friends, Wyatt and Ben take Joel on a road trip in Wyatt's van to lift his spirits and take revenge on Dr. Dwayne. In hopes of getting a job with Oscar Mayer, Wyatt has customized his van into a cross-country hotdog stand called the Weiner Wagon.

On the road trip, they encounter several outrageous characters and have silly adventures. As they approach their destination, Joel abandons his friends in a fit of hopelessness, winding up drunk in a back alley.  His childhood tormenter, Drake Hanswald, appears in a hallucination, and Joel watches helplessly as his younger self is tormented by Drake and all of his other classmates.  Realizing that he needs to change his situation and stand up for himself, Joel returns to his friends just in time to save them from the hippies who had previously stolen Wyatt's hood ornament.

The next morning, they sneak into the studio where Dr. Dwayne's show is filmed.  After beating up Dr. Dwayne's decoy, the real Dr. Dwayne appears, revealing that he intentionally caused Joel's breakup to motivate Joel to take a stand for himself.  He also reveals that he has found a rich man that Wyatt had saved from a life of drugs, who is willing to finance Wyatt's Wieners. Ben makes a speech to the audience and accepts his homosexuality.

Now that the friends have all achieved what they needed, they head home, and we learn that Wyatt's Wieners became the 4th most successful pre-packaged meat company in the U.S. Wyatt now lives in a hotdog-shaped house with his dachshund Beyoncé.  Ben went on to become a successful lawyer and cologne designer who currently lives with his "roommate" Johnathan and their two cats.  Joel invented pants which cannot be yanked down, and the three friends take the Wiener Wagon on a road trip every year to spread cross-country happiness.

Cast
Fran Kranz as Joel Cooper
Kenan Thompson as Wyatt Fabio Goldstein
Zachary Levi as Ben Fallon
Darrell Hammond as Dr. Dwayne
Jenny McCarthy as Ms. Rebecca Isaac
Andy Milonakis as Drake Hanswald/Timmy O'Shamus
Mindy Sterling as Mrs. Frank Applebaum
Blake Clark as Mr. Felicia Applebaum
Joel Moore as Greg King
Kyle Gass as Walrus Boy
Sarah Drew as Karen Kemper
John Farley as Cornelius Worthington III
Sarah Wright as Lavender (credited as Sarah Mason)
Chris Pratt as Bobby

External links
 
 

2008 films
American comedy road movies
2000s comedy road movies
2008 comedy films
Films scored by David Kitay
2000s English-language films
2000s American films